Dickey Lake is a lake in Montana, United States.

See also
List of lakes in Montana
List of lakes in Lincoln County, Montana

References

Glacial lakes